Skúsime to cez vesmír (which translates to Flying through the Universe) is the second album by Slovak rock band Tublatanka released in 1987 by Opus Records. It contains the hit singles Skúsime to cez vesmír and Dnes.

Track listing 
 "Vo veľkej škole dní"
 "Šlabikár II"
 "Neváham..."
 "Dotyk rúžom na pohár"
 "Skúsime to cez vesmír"
 "Dnes"
 "Mám byť iný"
 "Veľké nádeje"
 "Už som váš"
 "Tuláčik s dobrou povesťou"
Lyrics written by Martin Sarvaš
Music written by Maťo Ďurinda

Credits 
BAND
Maťo Ďurinda - lead vocals (except on "Neváham"), lead and rhythm guitars, piano
Palo Horváth - bass guitar, backing vocals, lead vocals on "Neváham", co-lead vocals on tracks 1, 2, 5, 6, 8
Ďuro Černý - drums, percussion

Guests
Braňo Černák, Peter Uherčík, Paľo Sevský, Dušan Horecký, Peter Sámel, Jano Kuric, Peter Penthor, Robo Stanke, Ľubo Bočev, Tomáš Krnáč, Miro Binder, Peter Peteraj, Bohuš Dobál, Igor Skovay, Karol Vilček, Sergej Michalič, Maroš Hnidiak, Vlado Mrazko, Dušan Králik, Ilja Thurzo, Fedor Šrobár, Vít Fila, Jožo Hanák - backing vocals on "Vo veľkej škole dní"

See also
 The 100 Greatest Slovak Albums of All Time

References 

1987 albums
Tublatanka albums